The Northwest Nazarene Nighthawks (formerly the Crusaders) are the athletic teams that represent Northwest Nazarene University, located in Nampa, Idaho, in intercollegiate sports as a member of the Division II level of the National Collegiate Athletic Association (NCAA), primarily competing in the Great Northwest Athletic Conference (GNAC) since the 2001–02 academic year. The Nighthawks previously competed in the D-II Pacific West Conference (PacWest) during the 2000–01 school year; and in the Cascade Collegiate Conference (CCC) of the National Association of Intercollegiate Athletics (NAIA) from 1993–94 to 1999–2000.

Rivalries
The school's main rival is the NAIA's College of Idaho, located a short distance to the west in Caldwell, Idaho.

Athletic director
A prominent former member of the school's athletic department is Scott Flemming, who coached India’s national basketball team for several years.

Varsity teams
NNU competes in 13 intercollegiate varsity sports: Men's sports include baseball, basketball, cross country, golf, soccer and track & field; while women's sports include basketball, cross country, golf, soccer, softball, track & field and volleyball.

References

External links
 

College sports teams in the United States by team
Northwest Nazarene University
Great Northwest Athletic Conference teams
Former Pacific West Conference teams